Fosbury Camp, is the site of an Iron Age bivallate hillfort located in Wiltshire. The site is oval in shape, and approximately 26 acres in area

The site is a scheduled national monument number WI162. The fort sits atop Knolls Down and is excellently defended to the south, south west, and east, from the very steeply sloped topology. To the north the land is less steep, and is mostly bounded by Oakhill Wood. To the west the ground rises to the true summit of Haydown Hill. In the eastern side of the camp there lies a pond, perhaps an original feature of the neolithic site.

Location
It lies at a height of 254m AOD, slightly below the summit of the hill at 258m AOD. The site is easily accessed by public footpaths running to the north of the site, and the borders of Oakhill Wood.

References

See also 

List of places in Wiltshire
List of hill forts in England
List of hill forts in Scotland
List of hill forts in Wales



Iron Age sites in England
Hill forts in Wiltshire
Archaeological sites in Wiltshire